The Pemanggil Island rock gecko (Cnemaspis pemanggilensis)  is a species of gecko endemic to Pemanggil Island in Malaysia.

References

pemanggilensis
Reptiles described in 2006